Hey Now! (Remixes & Rarities) is an album of club remixes by American singer Cyndi Lauper, which also includes "The World is Stone" and "You Have to Learn to Live Alone" which have only been officially launched as singles in Europe, Japan and South America.

Track listing

2005 remix albums
2005 compilation albums
Sony Music remix albums
Sony Music compilation albums
Cyndi Lauper remix albums
Cyndi Lauper compilation albums